Jeffrey Wellington Austin (born October 19, 1976) is a former Major League Baseball pitcher who played for three seasons. He played for the Kansas City Royals from 2001 to 2002 and the Cincinnati Reds in 2003.
During a game against the Atlanta Braves on May 28, 2003, in what turned out to be his final appearance in the major leagues, Austin gave up 3 consecutive home runs to start the game, only the second time this had happened in Major League Baseball history.

Austin attended Stanford University, and in 1996 he played collegiate summer baseball with the Cotuit Kettleers of the Cape Cod Baseball League. He was selected by the Royals in the first round of the 1998 MLB Draft.

References

External links

1976 births
Living people
Sportspeople from San Bernardino, California
Kansas City Royals players
Cincinnati Reds players
Baseball players from California
Major League Baseball pitchers
Stanford Cardinal baseball players
Cotuit Kettleers players
Wichita Wranglers players
Wilmington Blue Rocks players
Omaha Golden Spikes players
Omaha Royals players
Louisville Bats players
Gulf Coast Reds players
Potomac Cannons players
Long Island Ducks players
All-American college baseball players
Stanford Cardinal baseball coaches